Fabio Wardley (born 18 December 1994) is a British professional boxer who has held the British heavyweight title since 2022.

Boxing career

Professional career

Managed by Dillian Whyte and trained by Robert Hodgins (as seen on tv), Fabio Wardley has won all 15 of his professional fights, with 14 of them by way of knock out.

Professional boxing record

References

External links 

1994 births
Living people
Sportspeople from Ipswich
English male boxers
Heavyweight boxers